Ginjinha or simply Ginja, is a Portuguese liqueur made by infusing ginja berries (sour cherry, Prunus cerasus austera, the Morello cherry) in alcohol (aguardente) and adding sugar together with other ingredients, with cloves and/or cinnamon sticks being the most common. Ginjinha is served in a shot form with a piece of the fruit in the bottom of the cup. It is a favourite liqueur of many Portuguese and a typical drink in Lisbon, Alcobaça, Óbidos, Marvão, Covilhã and Algarve. The Serra da Estrela ginja, centered around Covilhã, has protected designation of origin.

History

The Ginjinha of the Praça de São Domingos in Lisbon was the first establishment in that city to commercialize the drink that gives its name to it. A Galician friar of the Church of Santo António, Francisco Espinheira, had the experience of leaving ginja berries in aguardente, adding sugar, water and cinnamon. The success was immediate and Ginjinha became the typical drink of Lisbon. In the 2000s, the business was in the hands of the fifth generation. Around 150,000 litres of Ginjinha are produced each year, around 90% is consumed in Portugal and only around 10% is exported, the majority of it to the United States. The traditional liqueur is served all around Portugal, but is especially prominent in the Oeste and Lisbon regions. In Óbidos, Ginjinha is commonly served in a small edible chocolate cup.

Ginjinha bars in Lisbon 

Ginjinha Espinheira, since 1840.
Ginjinha Sem Rival, since 1890.
Ginjinha Rubi, since 1931.
Ginginha do Carmo, since 2011.

Ginja de Óbidos e Alcobaça 
The sour cherry used to produce the Ginja from Alcobaça and Óbidos was applied for a PGI status in 2013.

See also
 List of Portugal food and drink products with protected status

References

External links

 Ginja de Alcobaça www.ginja.pt
 www.ginjadeobidos.com

Portuguese liqueurs
Portuguese products with protected designation of origin
Cherry liqueurs and spirits
Fruit liqueurs